Moorefield is a town in Independence County, Arkansas, United States. It was named after Jesse A. Moore who owned most of the land in the area of the town at that time. The population was 137 at the 2010 census.

Geography
Sulphur Rock is about four miles to the east along Route 69. Moorefield Creek flows past the north side of the town.

Demographics

As of the census of 2000, there were 160 people, 64 households, and 48 families residing in the town. The population density was 51.1/km (132.7/mi2). There were 68 housing units at an average density of 21.7/km (56.4/mi2). The racial makeup of the town was 96.88% White, 0.62% Native American, and 2.50% from two or more races.

There were 64 households, out of which 31.3% had children under the age of 18 living with them, 62.5% were married couples living together, 9.4% had a female householder with no husband present, and 25.0% were non-families. 23.4% of all households were made up of individuals, and 6.3% had someone living alone who was 65 years of age or older. The average household size was 2.50 and the average family size was 2.94.

In the town, the population was spread out, with 23.8% under the age of 18, 7.5% from 18 to 24, 25.0% from 25 to 44, 26.9% from 45 to 64, and 16.9% who were 65 years of age or older. The median age was 39 years. For every 100 females, there were 90.5 males. For every 100 females age 18 and over, there were 96.8 males.

The median income for a household in the town was $26,875, and the median income for a family was $29,167. Males had a median income of $21,500 versus $19,722 for females. The per capita income for the town was $14,248. About 4.2% of families and 5.2% of the population were below the poverty line, including 12.5% of those under the age of eighteen and none of those 65 or over.

References

Towns in Independence County, Arkansas
Towns in Arkansas